Barry R. Holmes (born 17 August 1935) is an Australian diver. He competed at the 1956 Summer Olympics and the 1960 Summer Olympics.

References

External links
 

1935 births
Living people
Australian male divers
Olympic divers of Australia
Divers at the 1956 Summer Olympics
Divers at the 1960 Summer Olympics
20th-century Australian people
21st-century Australian people